Trish Ladner is an American politician serving as a member of the South Dakota House of Representatives from the 30th district. Elected in November 2020, she assumed office on January 12, 2021.

Career 
Ladner was elected to House with 8,668 votes along with Tim Goodwin, who received 8,435 votes.

Ladner is also a member of the South Dakota Executive Board. In June 2021, Ladner authored an op-ed in the Rapid City Journal in which she criticized critical race theory and pledged to support legislation to ban it from being taught in South Dakota.

Election history

References 

Living people
Republican Party members of the South Dakota House of Representatives
Women state legislators in South Dakota
People from Hot Springs, South Dakota
21st-century American politicians
21st-century American women politicians
Year of birth missing (living people)